Romang is an island, part of Barat Daya Islands in Indonesia, located at , east of Wetar Island. Alternate names in use are Roma, Romonu and Fataluku. It is included within the Terselatan Islands District (Kecamatan Pulau-Pulau Terselatan) within the Barat Daya Islands Regency of the Maluku Province; the District also includes the smaller (but more highly populated) Kisar Island further south.

References

External links

Languages of Indonesia (Maluku)

Barat Daya Islands
Islands of the Maluku Islands
Populated places in Indonesia